The Tony Award for Best Book of a Musical is awarded to librettists of the spoken, non-sung dialogue, and storyline of a musical play. Eligibility is restricted to works with original narrative framework; plotless revues and revivals are ineligible. This award was originally called the Tony Award for Best Author, until musicals were split off from dramas.

Winners and nominees

1940s

1950s

1960s

1970s

1980s

1990s

2000s

2010s

2020s

Award records

3 Wins
 Hugh Wheeler (2 consecutive)
 Thomas Meehan
 James Lapine

2 Wins
 Terrence McNally
 Larry Gelbart
 Peter Stone

Nomination records

5 Nominations
 Michael Stewart
 
4 Nominations
 Douglas Carter Beane
 James Lapine
 Terrence McNally
 Peter Stone
 Hugh Wheeler

3 Nominations
 Chad Beguelin
 Harvey Fierstein
 Michael John LaChiusa
 George C. Wolfe

2 Nominations
 Walter Bobbie
 Alain Boublil
 Mark Bramble
 Leslie Bricusse
 Betty Comden
 Joe DiPietro
 Bob Fosse
 Larry Gelbart
 Adolph Green
 John Guare
 Rupert Holmes
 Jim Lewis
 Craig Lucas
 Bob Martin
 Thomas Meehan
 Marsha Norman
 Tim Rice
 Dick Scanlan
 Claude-Michel Schönberg
 Neil Simon
 Joseph Stein
 David Thompson
 Melvin Van Peebles
 Andrew Lloyd Webber

External links
Tony Awards Official site
Tony Awards at Internet Broadway database Listing
Tony Awards at broadwayworld.com

Tony Awards
Awards established in 1949
1949 establishments in the United States